Van De Putte, Van de Putte, Vandeputte, or Van der Putte is a surname meaning "from Putte".

Notable people with the surname include:

Fabrice Vandeputte (born 1969), French football manager and former player
Isaäc Dignus Fransen van de Putte (1822–1902), Dutch politician
Leticia R. Van de Putte (born 1954), American politician
Lorca Van De Putte (born 1988), Belgian footballer
Robert Vandeputte, Belgian economist, civil servant and politician
Samuel van de Putte (1690–1745), Dutch explorer

See also
Van der Putten - surname
Putte (disambiguation)

Surnames of Dutch origin